.net is a top-level domain on the Internet.

.net or .NET may also refer to:

Science and technology

Software frameworks
 .NET (formerly called .NET Core), an open-source cross platform software framework and successor to .NET Framework
 .NET Framework, a software framework by Microsoft
 .NET Standard, an implementation standard

Other
 .net filename extension for a network configuration/info file
 net (magazine), formerly .net magazine
 .NET strategy, an unsuccessful marketing strategy of Microsoft from early 2000s

See also
 Net (disambiguation)
 NET (disambiguation)